The 2022 Primera División season, officially Liga de Fútbol Profesional Venezolano or Liga FUTVE, was the 66th season of the Venezuelan Primera División, the top-flight football league in Venezuela, and the 41st season since the start of the professional era. The season began on 24 February and ended with the final match on 30 October 2022.

Metropolitanos won their first title in the competition, beating Monagas on penalty kicks after drawing 1–1 after extra time in the final. Deportivo Táchira were the defending champions.

Format changes
On 6 October 2021, the Liga FUTVE initially announced the return of the Apertura and Clausura format for the 2022 season, with the top eight clubs advancing to a play-off stage in which international berths would be decided. It was also announced that clubs would be required to fully meet club licensing requirements in order to be allowed to take part in the competition.

The competition format was eventually confirmed by the Liga FUTVE on 12 January 2022 after a meeting with representatives from the 16 participating clubs. Instead of the Apertura and Clausura tournaments originally announced, the 16 clubs took part in a round-robin first stage in which they played each other twice (once at home and once away) for a total of 30 games, with the top 12 clubs advancing to the next round of the competition. The top four clubs, which qualified for the 2023 Copa Libertadores, advanced to a final stage (Fase Final Libertadores) where they played each other twice with the top two teams playing a single-legged final to decide the league champions. The teams placed 5th to 12th advanced to the Fase Final Sudamericana where they were divided into two groups of four, in which the top two of each group qualified for the 2023 Copa Sudamericana. The last-placed team in the first stage was relegated to Segunda División.

Teams
On 30 December 2021, the Venezuelan Football Federation announced the results of the club licensing process for the 2022 season. Atlético Venezuela and Gran Valencia had their license applications denied, as well as the 2021 Segunda División champions Titanes, and were unable to take part in the competition. As a result, no teams were promoted and the 2022 Primera División season was played by 16 teams.

{|

|}

Stadia and locations

Managerial changes

Notes

First stage
The first stage started on 24 February 2022 and ended on 18 September 2022.

Standings

Results

Fase Final Libertadores
The top four teams in the first stage contested Fase Final Libertadores, playing each other twice. The top two teams advanced to the final and also qualified for the group stage of the 2023 Copa Libertadores, whilst the third- and fourth-placed teams qualified for the preliminary stages of the same competition.

Standings

Results

Fase Final Sudamericana
Fase Final Sudamericana was contested by the teams ranked 5th to 12th in the first stage, which were drawn into two groups with the teams placed fifth and sixth in the previous stage being seeded into each group and played each other team in their group twice. The top two teams of each group qualified for the 2023 Copa Sudamericana.

Group A

Standings

Results

Group B

Standings

Results

Final
The final match was hosted by the team with the best performance in the first stage of the season.

Top goalscorers

Source: Liga FUTVE

References

External links
  of the Venezuelan Football Federation 
 Liga FUTVE

Venezuela
Venezuelan Primera División seasons
1